Railway stations in Guinea include:

Maps 
 UNHCR Atlas Map (2004) shows topography.
 UN map shows provinces; towns; railways
 ReliefWeb Map - Topography and Rail
 ReliefWeb Map - Population density and Roads
 Matakan-Simandou-Pontiolo Railway  - also shows line parameters
 Interactive map of Guinean railway system
 Sharemap
File:Railways in Guinea.svg

Cities served by rail

North Trans-Guinean Railways (Under construction) 

This 135 km long Standard Gauge railway connects bauxite mines at Boffa with a new port at Boké. Dapilon-Santou

Northern line 

This line is  gauge and carries about 12 million  tonnes per annum.

 Port Kamsar - port
 Boké 
 Sangarédi - bauxite mine

Central line 
This line is  gauge and heads off in a northwestern direction.

 Conakry - capital and port.
 Dubréka
 Fria - bauxite mine

Central Trans-Guinean Railway 

This line is  gauge.  Conversion to  gauge has been proposed. Rejuvenation of this line will be paid for by allow Simandou North iron ore to be exported to a more close by port in Liberia.

 Conakry - capital and port.
 Mambia - bauxite mine 
 Kindia - provincial capital.
 Kouyeya - waystation
 Kolèntèn
 Sougeta - waystation
 Konkouré - several km north of railway
 Mamou - provincial capital
 Kégnégo
 Diagouré - proposed junction
 Dabola - junction and break of gauge
 Bissikrima 
 Cisséla  
 Kouroussa - bridge over Niger River
 Kankan terminus and provincial capital.

 (possible extension)
 Zogota

Southern branch 

 Dabola junction and break of gauge
 Tougué bauxite

South Western line 

 Conakry - capital and port. Rail Map (red dots) Rail Map (gray lines)
 Kindia bauxite mine.

South Trans-Guinean Railways (Proposed) 
The heavy duty Transguinean Railways is about 670 km long and would be .  It goes from iron ore mines in the south east near Simandou and bauxite mines in the north to a new port at Matakong. The link may be double track. This project has been delayed by a coup. In 2001, this line was estimated to cost $3,000m. The line includes 21 km of tunnels which might mean one tunnel 21 km long, or 21 tunnels each 1 km long.

Tougué Branch 
 Marela - possible junction to Central line
 Diagouré - junction with Central line 
 Pontiola - bauxite
 Tougué - branch terminus - bauxite

Proposed Guinea - Liberia Railway 
(This line would be heavy duty  gauge)
 Zogota iron ore 
 Simandou (north) - iron ore deposit near Diéké 
 Nimba - iron ore
 (Lamco Railway of  gauge) being rehabilitated by ArcelorMittal).
 (Lamco Railway runs parallel to Guinea-Liberia Railway for a considerable distance)
 Buchanan - closest port
 Didia. new port owned by BSG Resources.

Proposed Mali railway 
  Kankan, Guinea.
   border.
  Bamako, Mali.

Timeline

2020 
 Work starts on Dapilon (port) - Santou (mine) railway) 1435mm gauge

2014 
 Conference

2010 

 Guinea and Liberia agree to build transborder railway for iron ore traffic. This railway would be shorter and cheaper than a railway entirely within Guinea territory.  As part of the deal, the narrow gauge Trans-Guinean railway would be renovated. 1435mm gauge. Later rescinded.

See also 
 Transport in Guinea

References 

 
Railway stations
Railway stations